Héctor Eliner Carasco Giménez [Ec-tor he-MEH-nes] (born September 28, 1982) is a Venezuelan former professional baseball catcher. He has previously played in Major League Baseball (MLB) for the Chicago White Sox, Houston Astros and Los Angeles Dodgers.

Professional career

Houston Astros
Giménez was signed by the Houston Astros as an amateur free agent in 1999. He spent two years in the Venezuelan Summer League before joining the Astros U.S. based minor league system. At one point, Giménez was ranked the best defensive catcher in the Houston Astros system, according to Baseball America. In 2005, he led the Corpus Christi Hooks with 58 RBI and earned Texas League All-Star honors. He hit .273 (75-for-275) with eight home runs and 37 RBI in 76 games for the Round Rock Express in his first season at the Triple-A level in 2006.

He made his major league debut with the Astros on September 25, 2006 striking out as a pinch hitter against the Philadelphia Phillies. He made one other major league appearance, also as a pinch hitter, against the Pittsburgh Pirates on September 27 and groundout to the shortstop.

On February 26, 2007, Giménez decided to have surgery to repair a torn rotator cuff and as a result, missed the entire 2007 season.

Tampa Bay Rays
On November 27, 2007, he signed a minor league contract with the Tampa Bay Rays that included an invitation to spring training. He split the season between the A+ Vero Beach Devil Rays and the AAA Durham Bulls and then became a free agent at the end of the season.

Pittsburgh Pirates
He signed a minor league contract with the Pittsburgh Pirates in January 2009 and split the season between the AA Altoona Curve and AAA Indianapolis Indians. In 2010, he was with Altoona for the whole season and hit .305 in 94 games with 16 home runs, his highest total in any of his professional seasons.

Los Angeles Dodgers
He signed a minor league contract with the Los Angeles Dodgers in November 2010 but on November 19 he was purchased by the Dodgers and added to their 40-man roster. He appeared as a pinch hitter for the Dodgers on April 1, 2011, his first appearance in the Majors since 2006 with the Astros. He made his first career start the following day against the San Francisco Giants, and also recorded his first Major League hit, a single to left field in the seventh inning off Javier López. After appearing in four games, he was placed on the disabled list on April 10 and underwent arthroscopic knee surgery. He was activated off the DL on June 10 and outrighted to the AA Chattanooga Lookouts. He appeared in 66 games with the Lookouts, hitting .286 with 11 home runs and 54 RBI.

Chicago White Sox
He signed a minor league contract with the Chicago White Sox on January 15, 2012. He also received an invitation to spring training. He was designated for assignment on July 5, 2013.

Toronto Blue Jays
Giménez was traded to the Triple-A Buffalo Bisons in the Toronto Blue Jays' organization on May 25, 2014. He was assigned to the Double-A New Hampshire Fisher Cats without playing for Buffalo. He was promoted to Buffalo on June 16, and was released on July 14.

Milwaukee Brewers
On July 16, 2014, Giménez was signed to a minor league contract by the Milwaukee Brewers.

Mexican League
He signed in 2015 for the Leones de Yucatán of the Mexican League. He became a free agent after the 2016 season.

See also

 List of Major League Baseball players from Venezuela

References

External links
, or Baseball America, or Houston Astros news, or Retrosheet, or Pelota Binaria (Venezuelan Winter League)

1982 births
Living people
Altoona Curve players
Buffalo Bisons (minor league) players
Cardenales de Lara players
Charlotte Knights players
Chattanooga Lookouts players
Chicago White Sox players
Corpus Christi Hooks players
Durham Bulls players
Estrellas Orientales players
Venezuelan expatriate baseball players in the Dominican Republic
Houston Astros players
Huntsville Stars players
Indianapolis Indians players
Leones de Yucatán players
Lexington Legends players
Los Angeles Dodgers players
Major League Baseball catchers
Major League Baseball players from Venezuela
Mexican League baseball catchers
Mexican League baseball first basemen
Mexican League baseball third basemen
Navegantes del Magallanes players
New Hampshire Fisher Cats players
People from San Felipe, Venezuela
Round Rock Express players
Salem Avalanche players
Tigres de Aragua players
Venezuelan expatriate baseball players in Mexico
Venezuelan expatriate baseball players in the United States
Vero Beach Devil Rays players